Francisca is a feminine given name. Notable people with the name include:

 Francisca Ballesteros (born 1969), Spanish serial killer
 Maria Francisca Bia (1809-1889), Dutch dancer, singer, and actress
 Ana Francisca de Borja y Doria (1640-1706), first female governor of the Viceroyalty of Peru
 Francisca Duarte (1595–1640), Portuguese singer
 Francisca Campos (born 1985), Chilean mountain biker 
 Francisca del Espiritu Santo Fuentes (1647-1711), Filipina religious leader
 Francisca Martínez (born 1966), Mexican race walker
 Francisca Nuñez de Carabajal (circa 1540-1596), victim of the Inquisition
 Francisca Pleguezuelos (born 1950), Spanish politician
 Francisca Queiroz (born 1979), Brazilian actress
 Francisca Rojas (born 1865), Argentine murderer
 Francisca Senhorinha da Motta Diniz , Brazilian teacher and feminist
 Francisca Stading (1763-1836), Swedish opera singer
 Francisca Subirana (1900–1981), Spanish tennis player
 Francisca Wieser (1869–1949), American scientific illustrator
 Dilian Francisca Toro (born 1959), Colombian doctor and politician
 Francisca Urio (born 1981), German singer-songwriter and radio presenter
 Infanta Francisca Josefa of Portugal (1699-1736), Portuguese princess
 Infanta Maria Francisca of Portugal (1800-1834), daughter of King John VI of Portugal and Carlota Joaquina of Borbón
 Infanta Mariana Francisca of Portugal (1736-1813), Portuguese princess
 Maria Francisca of Nemours (1646-1683), Queen of Portugal
 Princess Francisca of Brazil (1824-1898), Brazilian princess and Portuguese infanta

Fictional characters with the name include:

 Francisca, from Kirby Star Allies

See also
Francesca

Feminine given names